Gregorio is a given name and a surname. Gregorio or Gregório may also refer to:

Geography
 Gregório River (Amazonas), Brazil
 Gregório River (Goiás), Brazil
 Gregorio Peak, British Columbia, Canada

People
 Gregorio (footballer) (born 1981), Equatoguinean footballer

Other uses
 Gregorio (software), a free and open-source scorewriter computer program